Coldmoorholme (or Coldmoorholm, formerly Coldmoorham or Coldmorham) is a hamlet in the parish of Little Marlow in Buckinghamshire, England. It is now considered part of the village of Bourne End, and locally the area is known as 'Spade Oak'.

Hamlets in Buckinghamshire